Aks 13 may refer to:

Aks 13000, a Norwegian sabotage squad from World War II
USS Hesperia (AKS-13), a US Navy ship